Burton upon Trent, also known as Burton-on-Trent or simply Burton, is a market town in the borough of East Staffordshire in the county of Staffordshire, England, close to the border with Derbyshire. In 2011, it had a population of 72,299. The demonym for residents of the town is Burtonian.

Burton is known for its brewing. The town grew up around Burton Abbey. Burton Bridge was also the site of two battles, in 1322,  when Edward II defeated the rebel Earl of Lancaster and in 1643 when royalists captured the town during the First English Civil War. William Lord Paget and his descendants were responsible for extending the manor house within the abbey grounds and facilitating the extension of the River Trent Navigation to Burton. Burton grew into a busy market town by the early modern period.

The town is served by Burton-on-Trent railway station. The town was also the start and terminus of the now defunct South Staffordshire Line which linked it to Lichfield, Walsall, Dudley and Stourbridge.

Toponymy
The name Burton upon Trent derives from the meaning "a settlement at a fortified place" along the River Trent and dates from the 8th century.

History
Rykneld Street, a Roman road, ran north-east through what later became the parish of Burton, linking camps at Letocetum (Wall), near Lichfield and Derventio (Little Chester) near Derby.

Between 666 and 669 Wilfrid, the pro-Roman bishop of York, exercised episcopal functions in Mercia, whose Christian king, Wulfhere, gave him land in various places, on which he established monasteries. Burton was almost certainly one of the sites: the name Andresey given to an island in the river Trent near the parish church means "Andrew's isle" and refers to a church there dedicated to St Andrew. The island is associated with the legend of St Modwen or Modwenna, an Irish abbess. It is likely that any surviving religious house would have been destroyed during the Danish incursion into the area in 874. Place names indicate Scandinavian influence, and several personal names of Scandinavian origin were still used in the area in the early 12th century. In 1003 a Benedictine abbey was established on a new site on the west bank of the Trent at Burton by Wulfric Spott, a thegn. He is known to have been buried in the abbey cloister in 1010, alongside his wife.

Burton Abbey was mentioned in the Domesday Book of 1086, where it was said to control lands in Appleby Magna in Leicestershire, and Mickleover, Winshill, Stapenhill, Coton in the Elms, Ca(u)ldwell (in Stapenhill Parish) and Ticknall, all then in Derbyshire. The monastery was the most important in Staffordshire and by the 1530s had the highest revenue. It is known that there were frequent Royal visits to the abbey, including those by William I, Henry II and Edward I. In the 12th and 13th centuries, streets were laid out off the west side of High Street, the earliest being New Street, which stretched from the abbey gates towards the line of Ryknild Street. Horninglow Street at the north end of High Street was part of a major east–west route using the bridge over the river.

A royal charter was granted on 12 April 1200 by King John to the Abbot to hold a market in Burton every Thursday. This charter was later renewed by King Henry III and King Edward IV. There were four annual fairs for trade in horses, cattle and produce: on Candlemas Day, 5 April, Holy Thursday, and 29 October (the feast of St Modwen) although as in other British towns this practice has died out.

While Burton's great bridge over the Trent was in poor repair by the early 16th century, it served as "a comen passage to and fro many countries to the grett releff and comfort of travellyng people", according to the abbot. The bridge was the site of two battles, first in 1322 when Edward II defeated the rebel Earl of Lancaster and also in 1643 when the Royalists captured the town during the First English Civil War.

Under Henry VIII the abbey was dissolved in 1539, to be refounded in 1541 as a collegiate church for a dean (who had been the last abbot) and four prebendaries. It was again dissolved in 1545 and granted to Sir William Paget. Paget began planning to expand the Manor House within the abbey precincts, known to have existed since at least 1514, into a grand mansion. To provide the materials for this project, the old abbey buildings were to be cannibalised. There were major alterations to the house over the next three centuries. Sir William died in 1563.

In 1585 it was suggested that Mary, Queen of Scots might stay at Burton while Tutbury Castle was cleaned, but it was said that it was "a ruinous house, the buildings scattered and adjoining a very poor town, full of bad neighbours". The Paget family was implicated in Catholic plots against Queen Elizabeth I, the manor house along with most of the family estates were confiscated, with the Manor House leased to Richard Almond in 1612. Parts of the abbey church may have been retained for parish use, however these were demolished and replaced by a new church in 1719–1726. Some fragments remain of the chapter house nearby, but little of the rest remains. Two buildings were converted to residential use—a part known as the Manor House and the former Infirmary. The Infirmary became known as The Abbey and is now an inn.

Canals and breweries
The Paget family's lands and title were restored to them by James I in 1604 and they owned considerable estates around Burton for over 150 years. In 1699, William Lord Paget obtained an Act of Parliament to extend navigation on the River Trent from Nottingham up to Burton, but nothing was immediately done. In 1711 Lord Paget leased his rights to George Hayne, who in 1712 opened the River Trent Navigation and constructed a wharf and other buildings in the precinct of the old abbey. This led to the development of Burton as the major town for brewing and exporting beer, as it allowed Burton beer to be shipped to Hull, and on to the Baltic Sea and Prussia, as well as to London, where it was being sold in 1712. A number of breweries opened in the second half of the 18th century. The Napoleonic blockade badly affected overseas trade, leading to some consolidation and a redirection of the trade to London and Lancashire via canals. When Burton brewers succeeded in replicating the pale ale produced in London, the advantage of the water's qualities, in a process named Burtonisation allowed the development of the trade of Burton India Pale Ale (an ale specially brewed to keep during the long sea voyage to India). New rail links to Liverpool enabled brewers to export their beer throughout the British Empire.

Burton came to dominate the brewing trade, and at its height one quarter of all beer sold in Britain was produced here. In the second half of the 19th century there was a growth in native breweries, supplemented by outside brewing companies moving into the town, so that over 30 breweries were recorded in 1880. However at the beginning of the 20th century there was a slump in beer sales, causing many breweries to fail; the industry suffered from the Liberal government's anti-drinking attitudes. This time no new markets were found and so the number of breweries shrank by closure and consolidation from 20 in 1900 to 8 in 1928. After further mergers and buy-outs, just three main breweries remained by 1980: Bass, Ind Coope and Marston's.

Burton was home to the Peel family, who played a significant role in the Industrial Revolution. The family home is still visible in the town as Peel House on Lichfield Street. Her Majesty Queen Elizabeth II visited the town on 3 July 2002 during her Golden Jubilee celebrations.

Governance
Burton is the administrative centre for the borough of East Staffordshire and forms part of the Burton constituency. The local Member of Parliament (MP) is the Conservative Party's Kate Griffiths, who has represented the Burton constituency since December 2019. The Conservatives took the seat from Labour in the 2010 general election with an 8.7% swing.

Burton was incorporated as a municipal borough in 1878. The incorporated area was split between the counties of Staffordshire and Derbyshire – the Local Government Act 1888 incorporated the entirety of the borough in Staffordshire, including the former Derbyshire parishes of Stapenhill and Winshill. It became a county borough in 1901, having reached the 50,000 population required.

It never substantially exceeded the population of 50,000, and at a population of 50,201 in the 1971 census was the smallest county borough in England after Canterbury. The Local Government Commission for England recommended in the 1960s that it be demoted to a non-county borough within Staffordshire, but this was not implemented. Under the Local Government Act 1972, the town became on 1 April 1974, an unparished area in the new district of East Staffordshire.

The town became entirely parished on 1 April 2003, when the parishes of Anglesey, Branston, Brizlincote, Burton, Horninglow and Eton, Shobnall, Stapenhill, and Winshill were created. Burton parish itself only covers the town centre, with the other parishes covering various suburbs.

Geography
It is at the easternmost border of the county of Staffordshire with Derbyshire, its suburbs and the course of the River Trent forming part of the county boundary. It is also near the south-eastern terminus of the Trent and Mersey Canal.
Burton lies within the northern boundary of the National Forest.
The town centre is on the western bank of the River Trent in a valley bottom; its average elevation is about 50 metres above sea level; the village of Winshill and the suburb of Stapenhill rise to 130 m and 100 m respectively.

Burton became a centre for the brewing industry due in part to the quality of the local water, which contains a high proportion of dissolved salts, predominantly caused by the gypsum in the surrounding hills. This allowed a greater proportion of hops, a natural preservative, to be included in the beer, thereby allowing the beer to be shipped further afield. Much of the open land within and around the town is protected from chemical treatment to help preserve this water quality.

Region
There is some confusion as to whether Burton is in the West Midlands or the East Midlands, even though the entire urban centre is southwest of the River Dove, which forms the Derbyshire/Staffordshire boundary. Being in Staffordshire, the town officially lies within the West Midlands region. Several factors contribute to the ambiguity of the town's status. The local vernacular shares more similarities with East Midlands English than West Midlands English; the town was formerly within the East Midlands Utility (electricity/gas) areas and has Derby postcodes (DE13-DE15). However, it is served by the BBC Midlands (West Midlands) region based in Birmingham and before consolidation exercises formed part of the ITV Central (West) region, again based in Birmingham.

Green belt 

The suburbs of Winshill, Brizlincote and Stapenhill to the southeast of the town lie along a green-belt area, in place to stop uncontrolled development which could cause Burton to, in time, merge with neighbouring Swadlincote. The majority of this green belt lies in Derbyshire, with small tracts within Staffordshire.

Demography
The town had an estimated population of 43,784 in the 2001 Census. Stapenhill and Winshill were treated separately and together had a further population of 21,985 according to this source. According to the 2001 census, 71% of the town's population identify themselves as Christian, 12% as atheist or agnostic and 8.5% as Muslim.
In the 2011 Census, the population of the town, now treated wholly, came to 72,299.

Economy

Brewing

For centuries brewing was Burton's major trade, and it is still an important part of its economy.

The town is currently home to eight breweries; Coors Brewers Ltd: formerly Bass Brewers Ltd, and now the UK arm of Molson Coors Brewing Company – which produces Carling and Worthington Bitter; Marston's, Thompson and Evershed plc, bought by Wolverhampton & Dudley Breweries now renamed Marstons plc. The Marston's Brewery produces its own brands, draught Marston's Pedigree, draught Hobgoblin and also draught Bass under licence from InBev.

Burton Bridge Brewery is based in Bridge Street, with six pubs in and around Burton. It produces a number of traditional beers including Bridge Bitter, Stairway to Heaven, Damson Porter and Golden Delicious. Tower Brewery is a microbrewery off Wharf Road. Old Cottage Brewery is based in Hawkins Lane. Its beers include Oak Ale and Halcyon Daze. Black Hole Brewery is based at the Imex Centre. Gates Brewery microbrewery is in Reservoir Road.

Burton is also the corporate headquarters of the pub operators Punch Taverns plc and Spirit Pub Company which was brought by Greene King so doesn't have a headquarters there anymore, which were spun out of Bass in 1997. In addition, the White Shield microbrewery remains open alongside the National Brewery Centre (formerly the Bass Museum of Brewing).

A by-product of the brewing industry is the Marmite factory in the town. The original Marmite factory (now demolished) was at the corner of Cross Street and Duke Street before they moved to the current factory on Wellington Road in the 1960s. The production of Marmite has in turn generated the production of Bovril. Both are owned by multinational company Unilever.

Burton is also home to CAMRA's National Breweriana Auction that takes place each October in the Town Hall.

Manufacturing
Eatough's (sometimes Etough's) was a shoemaking firm from Leicestershire that opened a factory in Burton Road, Branston in 1920. It was the first British shoe factory to introduce music in the workplace (1936), and washable children's sandals ('Plastisha' 1957), but it closed in 1989 as a result of competition from cheap imports.

Briggs of Burton (formerly S. Briggs & Co.) is a Burton-based brewery and process engineering company established in 1732 by Samuel Briggs. Famous for its manufacturing innovation and craftsmanship across the world, Briggs moved from its works in New Street to Derby Street having taken over its rival Robert Morton DG in 1988. The former site is now occupied by the Octagon Shopping Centre.

Established in 1740, Thornewill and Warham was a metal hardware and industrial metalwork manufacturer, later an engineering company that became a notable producer of steam engines and railway locomotives. It also constructed two footbridges across the River Trent in Burton. It too was acquired by S. Briggs & Co, in 1929.

Retail

 
A market has been held on Thursdays in Burton since a charter was granted to the abbot by King John on 12 April 1200. Burton today has an indoor and an outdoor market, which are owned by East Staffordshire Borough Council. In 2011 the council contracted out responsibility for market stall rentals to private letting agency Quarterbridge. The Market Hall was built in 1883 from designs by Dixon & Moxon of Barnsley and opens from Tuesday to Saturday. A fish market was added to the hall in 1925. The outdoor market is held every Thursday, Friday and Saturday from 8.30am until 4pm. A farmer's market is held in the market square on the last Friday of every month.

The Coopers Square shopping centre is the principal shopping area, opened in 1970 by the Princess Alexandra but since considerably upgraded with a roof being added in the mid-1990s. The older Riverside Shopping Centre (known as Bargates) is now demolished.

An additional shopping centre is the Octagon Centre on New Street, constructed in the mid-1980s. There is another, much smaller shopping centre, Burton Place Shopping Centre, which was built in 1986 and originally known as Worthington Walk. Also located in the town centre is Middleway Retail Park, which includes a Cineworld multiplex cinema, Mecca Bingo, Matalan and restaurants, including Bella Italia and Nando's.

In 2005 a report by the New Economics Foundation rated Burton at 13.3 out of 60 for "individuality", putting it in the top ten clone towns in England, because of the large number of chain stores in the town centre. Since then events such as a French market have been organised to bring more footfall into the town centre.

Services
At one time Nord Anglia Education had its office at Nord House in Burton-upon-Trent.

Media services include Burton Mail and Capital Mid-Counties broadcasting on 102.4 FM from Winshill Water Tower.

Burton upon Trent power station in Wetmore Road generated electricity for the town, including the tram system, until it closed in 1976.

Distribution and warehousing 
Due to Burton's relative location in the centre of England and its transport links which allow easy access to Birmingham (the second largest UK city), Derby, Nottingham, Leicester and other locations, there are a significant number of warehouses based in Burton (and nearby Fradley Park).

Notable businesses with distribution centres and warehouses include B&Q, Boots, Hobbycraft, Holland & Barrett, DHL, Waterstones, Clipper and Amazon.

Culture and community

Culture

The main venue for live theatre and other performing and visual arts is The Brewhouse, which is run by East Staffordshire Council. During the 1970s and 1980s a number of well known rock bands appeared at the 76 Club nightclub in Burton, including Dire Straits and the Sex Pistols.
Bloodstock Open Air is an annual festival of heavy metal music, which takes place in August and has been held at Catton Hall in Walton-on-Trent, 8 miles south-west of Burton since 2005.

Burton Operatic Society is a musical theatre company based in Burton and produces two productions each year. The town was also home to the Burton School of Speech and Drama on Guild Street where many professional and amateur actors and actresses learned their craft. Following the closure of the school in July 1984, its in-house amateur company, the Little Theatre Players, continued life as an independent amateur drama company called The Little Theatre Company. LTC currently stages at least four productions a year in the town: two plays, a musical and a youth production.

Burton has one of the oldest amateur radio clubs in the UK. It was formed in 1919, although there were enthusiasts of wireless telegraphy in Burton well before the First World War. One of the founder members of the club was F. V. A. Smith, call sign XSR, (X = experimental station). Smith was licensed on 3 July 1914 and one month later, he received a message from the Marconi spark transmitter at Poldhu in Cornwall, being sent to London, on the eve of the outbreak of war. The message, which has survived and is in the present club archives, was announcing the mobilisation of Russian, French and Belgian troops.

The Statutes Fair takes place in the town every year on the first Monday and Tuesday after Michaelmas (29 September). This is usually on the first Monday/Tuesday in October but can occasionally fall on 30 September/1 October as in 2002. The fair occupies the Market Place and parts of High Street, New Street and Lichfield Street for two days.

Community facilities
The local Sea Cadet unit is TS (Training Ship) Modwena alongside the River Trent and road bridge. The town's Air Training Corps unit is No 351 (Burton-upon-Trent) Squadron. The local Army Reserve unit is F (Fire Support) Company, 4 Mercian Regiment, an infantry unit at Coltman House Army Reserve Centre, Hawkins Lane; the unit was formerly a volunteer brigade of the North Staffordshire Regiment.

Landmarks

The town's connection with the brewing industry is celebrated in The Burton Cooper, a bronze sculpture by James Walter Butler. It was commissioned in 1977 and depicts a local craftsman making a barrel. It originally stood opposite the market and – despite opposition from many townspeople – was moved to its present location inside the Coopers Square Shopping Centre in 1994.

The National Brewery Centre (previously Coors Visitor Centre & the Museum of Brewing, before that it was the Bass Museum of Brewing), which celebrates the town's brewing heritage is its biggest tourist attraction. Claymills Pumping Station on the north side of Burton is a restored Victorian sewage pumping station, adjacent to the modern sewage works. Until 2005/2006 one of Burton's most distinguishable landmarks was Drakelow Power Station just south of Burton on the opposite side of the River Trent. The chimneys, boiler-house building and cooling towers have since been demolished.

The former Magistrates' Court is a distinctive neo-classical domed building in a commanding position facing Guild Street. It was built by Richard Kershaw to designs by Henry Beck and opened in 1909.

Finney's post, part of an ornate mediaeval oak post which once stood at the corner of the Market Place and High Street, is now in the Victoria and Albert Museum in London.

The Horninglow Street drill hall dates back to the early 19th century.

Transport

River
Burton now lies on both sides of the River Trent. Historically, there was just one bridge over the river, Burton old bridge (which carries the A511) and there was a small ferry that operated from "time immemorial".  This was eventually replaced by the Ferry Bridge. A second road crossing of the Trent is St Peter's Bridge (which carries the A5189) was opened in 1985.

Road
The A38, which bypasses the town, connects Burton to Birmingham and Derby.  The A444 links traffic to Coventry and the M42 motorway and the A511 links traffic to Leicester. The A5121 carries traffic through the middle of Burton connecting to the A38, A5189 and A511 respectively. The A5189 runs (West-East) across Burton and connects the A444 through Burton and across the River Trent.

Rail
The town is served by Burton-on-Trent railway station, which is accessed from the bridge on Borough Road. The station has two platforms: platform one for Derby, Nottingham and the North; platform two for Tamworth, Birmingham and the South. The station is situated on the Cross Country Route between the principal cities of Derby and Birmingham.

The station's operator is East Midlands Railway, although none of their trains call there. All services are provided by CrossCountry, with trains between Cardiff Central, Birmingham and Nottingham, as well as longer-distance services to destinations such as Bristol Temple Meads, Leeds and Newcastle. Burton is positioned at the southern terminus of the aborted Ivanhoe line.

The station utilises the PlusBus scheme where train and bus tickets can be bought together at a saving.

Bus
The town had its own municipal buses operated by Burton Corporation Transport and later East Staffordshire District Council after 1974. This was taken over by Stevensons of Uttoxeter in the mid-1980s and, in turn, was absorbed by Arriva Midlands in the late 1990s.

Midland Classic currently operate the majority of buses in the town to outlying areas such as Uttoxeter, Horninglow, Edge Hill, Stapenhill, Queen's Hospital Burton, Winshill, Stretton, Abbots Bromley, Tatenhill, Wetmore, Branston, Lichfield, Ashby-de-la-Zouch and East Midlands Airport having taken over the local depot of Arriva Midlands at Wetmore Road in August 2016. In August 2022, Midland Classic were acquired by Rotala. The vehicles will be rebranded into Diamond livery with the operations to be known as Diamond East Midlands and administered from the Tividale headquarters of Rotala.

Arriva Midlands continues to operate service X38 to Derby, jointly run with trentbarton who also run the villager V1 and V3 services to Derby.

Religious sites
The mother church of Burton is St Modwen's, a Georgian building which replaced the former Burton Abbey's church. Other Anglican parish churches built to serve the expanding population include Holy Trinity, St Mark's, Winshill, St Paul's, St John the Divine, Horninglow, St Chad's, All Saints and St Mary's, Stretton.

The Roman Catholic church in the town is St Mary and St Modwen's Catholic Church.

There are five mosques in Burton, three Bareilvi or Sufi, one Deobandi and one Salafi.
There is a Sikh Gurdwara established in St Chad's Community Centre.
Although there was a small Jewish community in Burton in the early half of the 20th century, there is no record of a synagogue being established. There was however a close relationship with the community in Derby, whose minister acted as visiting teacher and shochet.

Education
Burton & South Derbyshire College (BSDC) is a general further education college and is situated in the town centre. It attracts approximately 13,000 students from Burton and the surrounding towns and villages. It delivers a wide range of courses for all ages including 14- to 19-year-olds, adults into part-time study, employer training and higher education. Recently a 'university centre' has been developed within the college to enable students to study on franchised higher education courses, but is not in itself a university.

The University of Wolverhampton's School of Health and Wellbeing has a presence at Burton Health Education Centre located at the Queen's Hospital, which specialises in nursing.

Sport

Since the establishment of the Football League in 1888, Burton has been represented by four separate clubs in the League, two of which played in the league simultaneously in the 1890s. Burton Swifts became members of the Football League in 1892, and were joined by Burton Wanderers in 1894. Swifts played at Peel Croft, whilst Wanderers home ground was Derby Turn. Wanderers left the League in 1897, and the two clubs merged to form Burton United in 1901, with the new club playing at Peel Croft. United were voted out of the Football League in 1907, and folded in 1910. Burton All Saints were then left as the town's main club, becoming Burton Town in 1924, but folded in 1940. In 1950 Burton Albion were founded. Having moved from Eton Park to the Pirelli Stadium in 2005, Albion became the town's fourth Football League club in 2009 after winning the Football Conference. The team now play in League 1, the third tier of the English football league system, following relegation in 2017–18, after two years in The Championship. Burton is also the location of the St George's Park National Football Centre, which opened in 2012.

The Burton & District Cricket League has many notable clubs, including Burton Cricket Club, Dunstall Cricket Club, Abbott's Bromley, Yoxall and Lichfield Cricket Club.

Burton Rugby Football Club, one of the oldest rugby union clubs in the country, was established in 1870, when it played both association and rugby football rules. It did not adopt rugby union only rules until 1876.

The town is also home to the Burton Canoe Club on the banks of the River Trent. It has recently expanded and built its own clubhouse. Also along the River Trent in Burton are Burton Leander Rowing Club, which was founded in 1847 (and is one of the oldest rowing clubs in the country), and Trent Rowing Club, founded in 1863.

Burton Hockey Club was established in 1899. The club  promotes and supports seven men's teams, four ladies' teams, and a popular and successful youth academy. Home matches are played at Shobnall Leisure Complex in the shadows of Marstons Brewery, Shobnall Road. The club has also been recognised as working towards providing a Safe, Effective and Child Friendly club environment, and as such has been awarded the England Hockey Club's First Accreditation, (EH id: 1180).

Burton is home to the Powerhouse Gym International All-Round Weightlifting team, which was set up in 1985 by Steve Gardner (former World All-Round Weightlifting Champion – inducted into the IAWA (UK) Hall of Fame in 2000). The club trains All-Round Weightlifters, including powerlifting and Olympic weightlifting and is affiliated to the International All-Round Weightlifting Association. The Burton club hosted the 2008 IAWA World Championships.

Notable people

Early times 
 Robert Sutton (1544–1587 in Stafford) a Roman Catholic priest and martyr, beatified in 1987. 
 Edward Wightman (c.1580–1612), a General Baptist, last religious martyr to be burnt at the stake for 'heresy' in England.
 Daniel Watson (c.1617–1683) an English lawyer and politician, a captain of dragoons in the Derbyshire cavalry, a J.P. and he acquired and lived in Nether Hall

18th C. 
 Isaac Hawkins Browne FRS (1705–1760) politician, poet, and MP for Much Wenlock 1744–1754, friend of Samuel Johnson 
 William Bass, (1717–1787) founder of the brewery business of Bass & Co in Burton in 1777
 John Jervis, 1st Earl of St Vincent, (1735–1823) Admiral of the Fleet studied at Burton Grammar School from 1745 to 1749.
 Sir Jeffry Wyatville RA (1766–1840) an English architect and garden designer, made alterations and extensions to Chatsworth House and Windsor Castle.

19th C. 
 Michael Arthur Bass, 1st Baron Burton (1837–1909), industrialist, politician and philanthropist, member of the Bass brewing dynasty.
 John Gretton, 1st Baron Gretton CBE, VD, TD, PC, JP, DL (1867–1947) businessman, Conservative MP for Burton 1918–1943 and gold medallist at the 1900 Summer Olympics
 Sir William Bass, 2nd Baronet (1879–1952) a British racehorse owner and supporter of the early British film industry
 Arthur Mayger Hind (1880–1957), art historian and Keeper of the Department of Prints, British Museum, 1933–1945
 William Harold Coltman VC, DCM & Bar, MM & Bar (1891–1974) recipient of the Victoria Cross
 Lieutenant Colonel James Herbert Porter (1892–1973); creator of Newcastle Brown Ale
 Oswald Mosley (1896–1980), leader of the British Union of Fascists.

20th C. 
 Mabel Mercer (1900–1984), Jazz and Cabaret singer
 Rosalyn Boulter (1916–1997), actress, George Formby's co-star in George In Civvy Street as well as many British films
 Phil Seamen, (1926–1972), jazz drummer, who played and recorded with many famous jazz musicians
 Sir Stanley Clarke CBE, (1933–2004) businessman (St. Modwen Properties plc) and racecourse owner
 Philip Bond, (1934–2017) actor, played Albert Frazer in the 1970s BBC nautical drama The Onedin Line
 Christine Grahame MSP (born 1944), SNP politician and Deputy Presiding Officer of the Scottish Parliament
 David Macaulay, (born 1946), illustrator and writer 
 Anthony Hardy, (1951–2020) convicted serial murderer 
 Alastair Yates (1952–2018) former Sky News and BBC News journalist
 Brigadier Mike Stone (born 1953) a retired British Army officer, former Director of Information of the British Army and former Chief Information Officer of the Ministry of Defence
 Joe Jackson, (born 1954) an English musician and singer-songwriter 
 Nicholas Whittaker, (born 1957), author, journalist and former pupil of Burton Grammar School
 Paul Harvey (born 1960) a British musician and Stuckist artist
 Andrew Bridgen MP (born 1964), Conservative Party MP for North West Leicestershire. Brexiteer.
 Alison Lapper MBE (born 1965) an English artist, member of the Association of Mouth and Foot Painting Artists of the World
 Andrew Griffiths MP (born 1970) former Conservative MP for Burton
 Kate Kniveton, (born 1971), Conservative MP for Burton since 2019
 Paddy Considine, (born 1973), actor, film director, screenwriter, and musician
 Anna Passey, (born 1984),  actress
 Ashleigh Lynch, (born 1990), cricketer
 Nathan Dawe (born 1994) DJ and producer
 The Leisure Society (formed 2009) rock band formed by Nick Hemming
 Luca Gallone , (born 1996) magician

Sport 

 Arthur Girling (1807–1849) a cricketer who played for the North of England cricket team and Manchester
 Adrian Capes (1873–1955) and Arthur Capes (1875–1945) footballing brothers, over 640 pro appearances between them 
 Francis Pickering (1891–1966), professional footballer who played as a forward
 George Newberry (1917–1978) a track cyclist, bronze medallist in the 4.000m team pursuit at the 1952 Summer Olympics
 David Nish, (born 1947) former Leicester City and Derby County footballer who broke the British transfer record in 1972.
 Vic Halom (born 1948) a former footballer, played 452 pro games and stood for Parliament in Sunderland North in 1992
 Mark Holtom (born 1958) a retired English 110 m hurdler, who competed in the 1980 and 1984 Summer Olympics
 Neville Brown (born 1966) a British former boxer, British middleweight champion 1993–1998
 Mark Sale (born 1972) an English former professional footballer who played 321 pro games, now a first team coach under Gary Rowett with Stoke City
 Darren Stride (born 1975) a former professional footballer, captained Burton Albion for 12 years and played 654 games
 Tracey Hallam (born 1975) a former English badminton player, competed in the 2004 and 2008 Summer Olympics
 Carl Eyden (born 1980) cricketer
 Beth Rodford (born 1982) a British rower, she participated in the 2008 and 2012 Summer Olympics in London
 Peter Hickman, (born 1987) English professional motorcycle racer.
 Lewin Nyatanga, (born 1988), professional footballer plays for Northampton Town F.C. (on loan from Barnsley).
 Emily Simpkins (born 1990) an English footballer who plays as a midfielder for Brighton & Hove Albion W.F.C.
Frazer Clarke (born 1991) a British professional boxer who won a bronze medal at the 2020 Summer Olympics.
Kane Hemmings (born 1991) an English professional footballer who plays as a striker for Tranmere Rovers
Max Bird (born 2000) an English professional footballer who plays as a defensive midfielder for Derby County F.C.

Twin towns - sister cities 

 Elkhart, Indiana, United States
 Bielawa, Poland

References

Notes

Bibliography
 Joseph Addison in The Spectator in 1712 recorded visiting Vauxhall Gardens where he drank a glass of Burton ale.
 In the poem "Terence, this is stupid stuff" from A.E. Housman's A Shropshire Lad, the speaker asks the question, "Say, for what were hop-yards meant, / Or why was Burton built on Trent?" referring to the town's history of beer brewing.

Further reading
 Burton-on-Trent, Its History, Its Waters and Its Breweries by W Molyneux. Published by Trubner, 1869.
 History of Burton upon Trent by CH Underhill. Published by Tresises, Burton, 1941.
 County Borough, the History of Burton upon Trent 1901–1974. Part 1, Edwardian Burton by Denis Stuart. Published by The Charter Trustees of Burton upon Trent, 1975.
 County Borough, the History of Burton upon Trent 1901–1974. Part 2, 1914–1974 by Denis Stuart. Published by The Charter Trustees of Burton upon Trent, 1977.
 Deus Nobiscum, A History of Burton Grammar School by GE Radford. Published by GE Radford, 1973.
 A Brief History of St Modwen's, the Parish Church of Burton-upon-Trent by Ernest Aldington Hunt. Published by British Publishing Co, Gloucester, 1973.
 The Development of Industry in Burton-upon-Trent by CC Owen. Published by Phillimore, Chichester, 1978.
 Charters of Burton Abbey by PH Sawyer. Published by Oxford University Press, Oxford, 1979.

External links

 
 Burton Local History
 Burton upon Trent Local Community Site
 Love Burton History previously Burton 2000

 
Towns in Staffordshire
Market towns in Staffordshire
Former civil parishes in Staffordshire
Borough of East Staffordshire